Acetylcholinesterase collagenic tail peptide also known as AChE Q subunit, acetylcholinesterase-associated collagen, or ColQ is the collagen-tail subunit of acetylcholinesterase found in the neuromuscular junction. In humans it is encoded by the COLQ gene.

Function 

This gene encodes the subunit of a collagen-like molecule associated with acetylcholinesterase in skeletal muscle. Each molecule is composed of three identical subunits. Each subunit contains a proline-rich attachment domain (PRAD) that binds an acetylcholinesterase tetramer to anchor the catalytic subunit of the enzyme to the basal lamina. Multiple transcript variants encoding different isoforms have been found for this gene.

Clinical significance 

Mutations in this gene are associated with endplate acetylcholinesterase deficiency.

References

External links

Further reading